Hardtack is a simple type of biscuit or cracker.

Hardtack or Hard Tack may also refer to:

 Hardtack (game), a miniature wargame ruleset
 Hard Tack (horse) (1926–1947), an American Thoroughbred racehorse
 Hardtack Island, in Portland, Oregon, United States

See also 
 Operation Hardtack (disambiguation)